The Pretty Things/Philippe DeBarge is a bootleg of psychedelic pop recordings made by the English band Pretty Things with French playboy Philippe DeBarge (1940-1999) in September 1969. The album was released in 2009. In 2017, it was re-issued under the name "Rock St. Trop" with new cover art and two bonus tracks.

Track listing

Personnel
Philippe DeBarge - lead vocals (tracks 1-12)
Phil May – backing vocals (tracks 1-12), lead vocals (track 13 only)
Vic Unitt - lead guitars, backing vocals (tracks 1-12)
Dick Taylor – lead guitar (track 13 only)
Wally Waller – bass, guitars, keyboards, percussion, backing vocals
Jon Povey – keyboards, drums, percussion, backing vocals
John C. Alder (aka Twink) - drums (tracks 2, 3, 4, 11)
Skip Alan – drums (track 13 only)

References

Pretty Things albums
1969 albums
2009 albums